The Tapestry of Creation or Girona Tapestry is a Romanesque panel of needlework  from the 11th century, housed in the Museum of the Cathedral of Girona, Catalonia, Spain. Measuring , it originally may have served as a baldachin for the Altar of the Holy Cross in the church's entrance. Some believe that it was used as a curtain or even a carpet. It depicts a series of theological scenes related with the Christian creation myths.

The "tapestry" is actually a panel of couched needlework laid down on the surface of the ground fabric, a terracotta wool intertwined with  different colors (red, green, yellow, dark and light blue, gray) wool and white linen threads. The border is formed by a frame, rather deteriorated, containing small square pictures which, according to some scholars, could have been added later to the central sector, due to their different, Byzantine-like style and themes.

The tapestry, of which only the upper part remains, is divided into three cycles:
the Genesis, presided over by the Christ Pantocrator
the cosmic elements
the Stories of the Holy Cross

The Christ Pantocrator, depicted as a beardless young man, occupies a circle in the center of the tapestry. He is surrounded by a circle whose sectors, aside from the upper one with a dove, symbol of God, show the seven days of the creation, until the creation of Adam and Eve. The two circles include quotes from the Genesis.

The remaining space in the rectangle including the central disk, houses at the corner four representation of Winds, depicted by four young winged men in Roman-like dresses, driving vessels and blowing air into horns. The central upper square is an old man representing the Year, with the Wheel of Time, while at the upper corners are the personifications of the Rivers of Paradise. The other six upper squares depict the Four Seasons, as well as Samson and Abel (or Cain).

The two lower corners show the personifications of the Sun (left, symbolizing Sunday) and the Moon (right, much deteriorated, symbolizing Monday), while the  side outer squares represent the months (only eight of which survive). At the bottom are incomplete scenes of the discovery of Holy Cross.

Sources

External links

Official cathedral's website 
Page with details of the figures 
Page with links to websites and the newest literature  (2012) 
The Art of medieval Spain, A.D. 500-1200, an exhibition catalog from The Metropolitan Museum of Art Libraries (fully available online as PDF), which contains material on Tapestry of Creation (no. 159) 

Romanesque art
Embroidery
11th-century works
Cultural depictions of Adam and Eve
Jesus in art